ISO 3166 is a standard published by the International Organization for Standardization (ISO) that defines codes for the names of countries, dependent territories, special areas of geographical interest, and their principal subdivisions (e.g., provinces or states). The standard employs a code of letters and numbers to represent the name of a given geographical area in order to save time and energy when describing the area, as well as to reduce the risk of description errors. The official name of the standard is Codes for the representation of names of countries and their subdivisions.

Parts
It consists of three parts:
 ISO 3166-1, Codes for the representation of names of countries and their subdivisions – Part 1: Country codes, defines codes for the names of countries, dependent territories, and special areas of geographical interest. It defines three sets of country codes:
 ISO 3166-1 alpha-2 – two-letter country codes which are the most widely used of the three, and used most prominently for the Internet's country code top-level domains (with a few exceptions).
 ISO 3166-1 alpha-3 – three-letter country codes which allow a better visual association between the codes and the country names than the alpha-2 codes.
 ISO 3166-1 numeric – three-digit country codes which are identical to those developed and maintained by the United Nations Statistics Division, with the advantage of script (writing system) independence, and hence useful for people or systems using non-Latin scripts.
 ISO 3166-2, Codes for the representation of names of countries and their subdivisions – Part 2: Country subdivision code, defines codes for the names of the principal subdivisions (e.g., provinces, states, departments, regions) of all countries coded in ISO 3166-1.
 ISO 3166-3, Codes for the representation of names of countries and their subdivisions – Part 3: Code for formerly used names of countries, defines codes for country names which have been deleted from ISO 3166-1 since its first publication in 1974.

Editions
The first edition of ISO 3166, which included only alphabetic country codes, was published in 1974. The second edition, published in 1981, also included numeric country codes, with the third and fourth editions published in 1988 and 1993 respectively. The fifth edition, published between 1997 and 1999, was expanded into three parts to include codes for subdivisions and former countries.

ISO 3166 Maintenance Agency
The ISO 3166 standard is maintained by the ISO 3166 Maintenance Agency (ISO 3166/MA), located at the ISO central office in Geneva. Originally it was located at the Deutsches Institut für Normung (DIN) in Berlin. Its principal tasks are:
 To add and to eliminate country names and to assign code elements to them;
 To publish lists of country names and code elements;
 To maintain a reference list of all country code elements and subdivision code elements used and their period of use;
 To issue newsletters announcing changes to the code tables;
 To advise users on the application of ISO 3166.

Members
There are fifteen experts with voting rights on the ISO 3166/MA. Nine are representatives of national standards organizations:

 Association française de normalisation (AFNOR) – France
 American National Standards Institute (ANSI) – United States
 British Standards Institution (BSI) – United Kingdom
 Deutsches Institut für Normung (DIN) – Germany
 Japanese Industrial Standards Committee (JISC) - Japan
Standards Australia (SA) - Australia
Kenya Bureau of Standards (KEBS) - Kenya
 Standardization Administration of China (SAC) - China
 Swedish Standards Institute (SIS) – Sweden

The other six are representatives of major United Nations agencies or other international organizations who are all users of ISO 3166-1:

 International Atomic Energy Agency (IAEA)
 International Civil Aviation Organization (ICAO)
 International Telecommunication Union (ITU)
 Internet Corporation for Assigned Names and Numbers (ICANN)
 Universal Postal Union (UPU)
 United Nations Economic Commission for Europe (UNECE)

The ISO 3166/MA has further associated members who do not participate in the votes but who, through their expertise, have significant influence on the decision-taking procedure in the maintenance agency.

Codes beginning with "X"
Country codes beginning with "X" are used for private custom use (reserved), never for official codes. Despite the words “private custom”, the use may include other public standards. ISO affirms that no country code beginning X will ever be standardised.  Examples of X codes include:

 The ISO 3166-based NATO country codes (STANAG 1059, 9th edition) use "X" codes for imaginary exercise countries ranging from XXB for "Brownland" to XXY for "Yellowland", as well as for major commands such as XXE for SHAPE or XXS for SACLANT. 
 X currencies defined in ISO 4217.

Current country codes

See also

International Organization for Standardization
ISO 3166
ISO 3166-1
ISO 3166-2
ISO 3166-3
List of ISO 3166 country codes
Country code
International vehicle registration code
Lists of countries and territories
List of countries and inhabited areas
Sovereign state
List of sovereign states
List of associated states
List of de facto states
Dependent territory
United Nations
Member states of the United Nations
United Nations list of non-self-governing territories

Notes

References

External links
 ISO 3166 Maintenance Agency, International Organization for Standardization (ISO)

 
03166
Internationalization and localization